The ICC World ODI XI was a team chosen by the International Cricket Council (ICC), representing the most talented One Day International cricketers playing international cricket at the time. A One Day International (ODI) is an international cricket match between two representative teams, each having ODI status, as determined by the ICC. An ODI differs from a Test match in that the number of overs per team is limited, and that each team has only one innings. The ICC World XI has played four matches, one for the 2005 World Cricket Tsunami Appeal (where the World XI was made up of the best non-Asian players), and three in the 2005 ICC Super Series (where the World XI was made up of the best non-Australian players). The list is arranged in the order in which each player won his first ODI cap. In cases in which more than one player won his first ODI cap in the same match, these players are listed alphabetically by surname. All these players have represented their respective national teams too, but only the records of their games for the ICC World XI are given.

The ODI between the World XI and Asian XI ended in a World XI victory by 112 runs. Ricky Ponting, captaining the side, scored 115 as the World XI batted first and scored 344/8, with Chris Cairns and Brian Lara both scoring half centuries. The Asian XI was unable to reach 345 for victory but did make 232 from their innings. For every run scored in the match, $1,000 was donated to the tsunami appeal. Over 70,000 people attended the match which was televised in 122 countries. The endeavour raised over A$14 million. A second fund-raising match between the two teams was cancelled due to unsuitable playing conditions. 
 


Players
Statistics are correct as of 30 October 2005, since then no matches have been played by the World XI.

Key

General
 Denotes a player still active in international cricket as of 21 January 2017
*: an innings that ended not out
Mat: number of matches played
Batting
Inn: number of innings
NO: number of times an innings ends not out
Runs: number of runs scored by batsman/off bowler's bowling
HS: highest score
Avg: batting average

Bowling
Balls: number of balls bowled
Wkt: number of wickets taken
BB: best bowling figures
Avg: bowling average
Fielding
Ca: number of catches taken
St: number of stumpings made

See also
 One Day International
 List of World XI Test cricketers
 List of World XI T20I cricketers

References

External links
Searchable database of International Cricketers (filtered by country) (Howstat)

World XI ODI